Callitris muelleri is a species of conifer in the family Cupressaceae. It is found only in New South Wales, Australia.

Description 
Callitris muelleri is a small tree or shrub growing to 6 meters tall. The leaves are hairless, glaucous to green in colour, with mature leaves measuring 5-10 millimeters long, juvenile leaves longer. This species is monoecious. The male cones measure 3 millimeters long and occur in clusters at the ends of the leaves, while the female cones are spherical, measure 20-30 millimeters in diameter, occur solitarily or in clusters, and may remain on the branches after maturity.

References

muelleri
Trees of Australia
Pinales of Australia
Least concern flora of Australia
Flora of New South Wales
Trees of mild maritime climate
Taxonomy articles created by Polbot